Rodney Kenji Oshita (born June 25, 1959 in Los Angeles, California) is an American former handball player who competed in the 1984 Summer Olympics and in the 1988 Summer Olympics.

References

1959 births
Living people
Sportspeople from Los Angeles
American male handball players
Olympic handball players of the United States
Handball players at the 1984 Summer Olympics
Handball players at the 1988 Summer Olympics
Medalists at the 1987 Pan American Games
Pan American Games gold medalists for the United States
Pan American Games medalists in handball
20th-century American people